Diaphorobacter nitroreducens is a Gram-negative bacterium from the genus of Diaphorobacter which has been isolated from activated sludge in Japan.

References 

Comamonadaceae
Bacteria described in 2003